The Green Line is one of the two lines in the Dubai Metro network in Dubai, United Arab Emirates. It runs through Deira and Bur Dubai, generally parallel to Dubai Creek. There are 20 stations on the line, spanning from Etisalat to Creek (numbered 11 to 30 in zones 5 and 6) covering . It was built by a consortium of Mitsubishi, Obayashi, Kajima and Yapı Merkezi.

Statistics
The Green Line has 20 stations, including 12 elevated (by means of a viaduct), and 8 underground stations. Trial running began in October 2010, with the line inaugurated on 9 September 2011 and opened to the public the next day. The last two stations (Al Jadaf and Creek) were opened on March 1, 2014. , 19 trains are running on the Green Line and each of the trains has a capacity of 643 seats.

Notable stations
There are two transfer stations, Union and BurJuman, where the Green and Red Lines intersect, allowing passengers to change between lines. The Green Line has its main depot in Al Qusais.

Union station is touted to be one of the biggest metro stations in the world. With an area spanning , it has capacity to handle about 22,000 passengers per hour.

The biggest elevated station on the Green Line is the Al Qiyadah station along Al Ittihad Road near the Dubai Police General HQ. The station has a capacity to handle 11,000 passengers per hour in each direction.

The two terminal stations are Etisalat and Creek. The Creek station is within walking distance of the Al Jaddaf Marine Station, linked to ferries on Dubai Creek, including an abra boat service to the Dubai Festival City Mall across the Creek.

Extension
According to Gulf News in 2014, the plan to further extend the Green Line to Academic City is fully approved, in order to better serve the interests of residents in the Silicon Oasis and International City area.

Route

References

External links

 RTA DUBAI METRO GREEN LINE: Train ride tour from Etisalat to Creek Metro Station POV 4K 2020 on YouTube
 Dubai Metro – Green Line – Part 2 (2013) on YouTube

2011 establishments in the United Arab Emirates
Dubai Metro Green Line
Dubai Metro
Roads and Transport Authority (Dubai)